Aidan Cassar (born 17 December 1999), known professionally as Aidan, is a Maltese singer and songwriter.

Career
In 2018 he competed in the Malta Eurovision Song Contest with Dai Laga. Afterwards, he participated in the X Factor Malta.

In 2019 he represented Malta in the OGAE Song Contest 2019 with the song "The Feeling". The song was entered in the Mużika Mużika competition in 2021, it was the first time he has written a song in Maltese and performed in Maltese. The music video won music video of the year at Lovin Malta Social Media Awards in 2021.

His single "Naħseb Fik" has been compared with "Tick Tock" by Clean Bandit and Mabel and was said to have a similar cord progression. Aidan responded to this by saying “My passion is actually keeping up to date with what’s in or not in the pop-commercial scene; what’s fashionable at the moment. I love creating, I listen to hundreds of tracks continuously just to get inspired.” He denied the beat and melody were plagiarised.

He entered the Malta Eurovision Song Contest in 2022 with the song "Ritmu", placing second. The song went on to top the Maltese Radio airplay charts for three weeks,  and performed at a Eurovision pre-party in London.

He announced the jury results for Malta at the Eurovision Song Contest 2022.

On July 24, 2022, he performed live with songs "Naħseb Fik" and "Ritmu" during Isle Of MTV 2022 in Floriana.

In 2023 he entered the Malta in the Eurovision Song Contest again with the song Reġina. He was disqualified from the contest allegedly due to Social Media posts about his song which is not allowed by Public Broadcasting Services. He threatened PBS with legal action  but went on to perform a medley of his songs in the interval.

Discography

Studio albums

Singles

References 

Maltese pop singers
Maltese songwriters
1999 births
Living people
People from Żejtun